The Buzat is a left tributary of the river Desnățui in Romania. It flows into the Desnățui near Urzica Mare.

References

Rivers of Romania
Rivers of Dolj County